Muhammad Shahid Alam is a Pakistani economist, academic, and social scientist. He is a professor of economics at Northeastern University. He is a member of the Advisory Board of the Institute for Policy Research & Development, London.

Background 
Alam was born to a Muhajir Family in 1950 in Dhaka, East Pakistan, moving to West Pakistan in 1971 following the creation of Bangladesh from East Pakistan. He holds a BA from the University of Dhaka, an MA from the University of Karachi, and a Ph.D. from the University of Western Ontario. (1979) His brothers are, the Pakistan Air Force flying ace, Air Commodore Muhammad Mahmood Alam and particle physicist M. Sajjad Alam.

Career 
Alam's academic writings focus, among other things, on the economic effects of Western foreign and economic policies on formerly colonized states. He writes critically about the present-day global wealth disparities produced by Western policies. He draws attention to the pro-capitalist ideological intent and Eurocentric biases of mainstream economics. An outspoken opponent of U.S. policies in the Middle East and the Global South,

He has published many books, including 
 Poverty from the Wealth of Nations (Macmillan, 2000), # Governments and Markets in Economic Development Strategies (Praeger: 1989),
 Is There An Islamic Problem (Kuala Lumpur: The Other Press, 2004, republished in 2007 as Challenging the New Orientalism, IPI: 2007),
 and most recently, Israeli Exceptionalism: The Destabilizing Logic of Zionism (Palgrave Macmillan: 2009). 
He is also a regular contributor to CounterPunch magazine.

Books 
Israeli Exceptionalism: The Destabilizing Logic of Zionism (Palgrave Macmillan, 2009).
Challenging the New Orientalism: Dissenting Essays on the "War Against Islam" (IPI, 2007).
Is there an Islamic problem? : essays on Islamicate societies, the US, and Israel (The Other Press, 2004).
Poverty From the Wealth of Nations: Integration and Polarization in the Global Economy since 1760 (Macmillan, 2000).
Governments and Markets in Economic Development Strategies: Lessons From Korea, Taiwan, and Japan. (Praeger, 1989).

References

External links 
 Faculty Page at Northeastern University

Northeastern University faculty
University of Karachi alumni
University of Dhaka alumni
Pakistani economists
Living people
People from Dhaka
People from Karachi
Pakistani emigrants to the United States
Year of birth missing (living people)
University of Western Ontario alumni
Fellows of Pakistan Academy of Sciences
Pakistani people of Bihari descent
American academics of Pakistani descent